Renegades is a 2022 British crime action thriller film directed by Daniel Zirilli, starring Nick Moran, Lee Majors, Ian Ogilvy, Louis Mandylor, Michael Paré, Danny Trejo, Patsy Kensit and Billy Murray.

Plot
When a retired Green beret soldier is murdered by an international drug gang in London, four of his veteran SAS comrades set out to avenge him, dispensing their own brand of justice on the streets of London.

Cast
 Nick Moran as Burton
 Lee Majors as Carver
 Ian Ogilvy as Peck
 Louis Mandylor as Goram
 Michael Paré as Donovan
 Danny Trejo as Sanchez
 Patsy Kensit as Judy Carver
 Billy Murray as Woody
 Paul Barber as Harris
 Stephanie Beacham as Hartigan 
 Jeanine Nerissa Sothcott as Moore
 Tom Lister Jr. as Apollo
 Michael Brandon as Palmer
 Andy Gatenby as Andre
 Paul Kennedy as Collins
 Lara Pictet as Sofia
 James Chalke as Savo
 Jon Xue Zhang as Blaze
 Nick Khan as Skiver
 Tom Tidiman as Genas
 Danny Bear as Yakveni

Production
The film was shot in London with filming wrapping in October 2021. The film-makers described Harry Brown and The Wild Geese as influences on the film.

Release 
The film was released for streaming in the United Kingdom on 1 October 2022.

Reception
The film has received mixed reviews. Leslie Felperin, reviewing the film for The Guardian, gave it two out of five stars. Felperin stated that the fim 'belatedly cashes in on the 2010s trend for “geri-action” films' and resembled American fisticuff- and gunfire-packed thrillers such as the Red and Expendables franchises, which were also built around former big-name actors supplementing their pension schemes. Felperin criticised the dialogue within the film which, in their view, sounded 'as if it was written by one of those newfangled AI chatbots, or maybe an actual human being who aspires to write as well as an AI chatbot but is not there yet'. In contrast, a reviewer for IndieWrap stated that the film was 'marked by high stakes, gory shootouts and spectacular explosions' and was 'a highly engaging and spectacularly entertaining action film that succeeds in more ways than one'. Similarly, Chris Ward described the film as 'a very enjoyable movie' and stated that it was a 'mash-up of Expendables, Death Wish and every Cockney geezer crime movie you have ever seen'. In his review of the film, which he gave a B-, Jim McLellan stated that British entries in the geezer action genre range from the serious Harry Brown to the silly Cockneys vs Zombies. In McLellan's view, Renegades sits somewhere between those two. McLellan commented that the influence of Guy Ritchie on the film was 'palpable', but that the movie lacked 'the same amount of charm' as Ritchie's movies. However, McLellan stated that Ian Ogilvy was 'an honourable exception' in this respect and demonstrated 'exactly why he was a leading contender in the eighties to succeed Roger Moore in wearing the Bond tuxedo'. Rob Williams described the film as 'a fun adventure with a lot of famous faces and reasonably shot action'.

References

External links
 

2022 action thriller films
2022 crime action films
2022 crime thriller films
2020s British films
2020s English-language films
British action thriller films
British crime action films
British crime thriller films
Films about human trafficking
Films about the illegal drug trade
Films directed by Daniel Zirilli
Films set in London
Films shot in London